Battleship Cove is a proposed MBTA Commuter Rail station in Fall River, Massachusetts. It is planned to be the southern terminus of the Fall River branch of the South Coast Rail project, and will open in 2030 as part of the project's Phase II. The station will have no parking—it is intended for tourists visiting Battleship Cove and the Fall River waterfront, with Fall River station to the north serving commuters—and will be open seasonally. Previous passenger service to Fall River included stations at Fall River Wharf (1847–1937) and Ferry Street (1864–1958). The Wharf station was the terminus of the Fall River Line steamship service.

History

Previous stations

The Fall River Railroad opened from Myricks to Fall River in June 1845, and to the Old Colony Railroad at South Braintree in December 1846. The first Fall River station was located at the south end of a short tunnel under Central Street. In 1847, the Fall River and Old Colony began running the Boston–Fall River Boat Train, which met Fall River Line steamers from New York at the Fall River Wharf; the Central Street station closed at that time. Wharf station also served the surrounding industrial area. The two railroads merged in 1854; after several name changes, it again became the Old Colony Railroad in 1872. 

The Old Colony subsidiary Old Colony and Newport Railway opened between Fall River and Newport in 1864, with an additional station at Ferry Street in Fall River. Newport was the terminal of the steamers until 1869, when they returned to Fall River. A station may have been briefly located at Cherry Street in the early 1870s. In 1872, the Fall River Line became part of the Old Colony system; in 1893, the Old Colony in turn became part of the New Haven Railroad. A rail yard was located near the station; the New Haven constructed a new roundhouse in 1927.

Steamship service between Fall River and New York ended in 1937, and passenger service between Fall River and Newport ended the next year. Passenger service to Boston, with Ferry Street as the terminal, continued (except for 1949-1952) until September 5, 1958. The line continued to be used for freight service by the New Haven and its successors Penn Central and Conrail, then finally as the CSX Fall River Subdivision. After the state purchased the line in 2010, freight service (which runs only as far south as Ferry Street) was transferred to the Massachusetts Coastal Railroad

New station
In September 2008, MassDOT released 18 potential station sites for the South Coast Rail project, including two sites in Fall River. Fall River station would be a full-time station serving commuters, while Battleship Cove station would be a seasonal station for tourists visiting Battleship Cove and the Fall River waterfront. A 2009 conceptual design called for a single side platform serving one track, with access at the center of the platform from City Gates Plaza.

In 2017, the project was re-evaluated due to cost issues. A new proposal released in March 2017 called for early service via Middleborough by 2024, followed by full service via Stoughton by 2029. Battleship Cove would have only been built during the second phase. By mid-2017, plans called for the first phase to be completed in 2022, and to include stations at Freetown and Battleship Cove in Phase 1 rather than Phase 2. However, the Draft Supplemental Environmental Impact Report released in January 2018 pushed Battleship Cove back to Phase II.

References

MBTA Commuter Rail stations in Bristol County, Massachusetts
Former New York, New Haven and Hartford Railroad stations
Buildings and structures in Fall River, Massachusetts
Railway stations scheduled to open in 2030
Proposed MBTA Commuter Rail stations